Holger Bruno Deising (born 18 October 1956) is a German agricultural scientist specialising in Phytomedicine and president of the German Phytomedicine Society.

Life and work 
Born in Krummsee, Ostholstein, Germany, Deising attended primary and grammar school in Kronshagen and Kiel, and passed the school-leaving examinations in 1975, after which he did military service (1975–1976).

He completed his studies at Kiel University with a Diploma in Agricultural Engineering, after which he worked as a Biology Assistant at the same university (1982–1987), ending with a dissertation entitled Physiological and biochemical investigations on nitrate reduction in the bryophyte Sphagnum. Deising then moved to the Institute of Pathology and Constance University (1988 bis 1996), where he gained a Professorship with Venia Legendi for Plant Physiology and Phytomedicine in 1996 with the subject Biochemical investigation of differentiation of infection structures of the broad bean rust fungus Uromyces viciae-fabae.

Books edited 
Dehne, H.W, Deising, H.B., Gisi, U., Kuck, K.H., Russell, P.E. (Eds.) 2008, Modern Fungicides and Antifungal Compounds V, DPG Spektrum Phytomedizin, DPG Selbstverlag. .
Deising, Holger B. (Ed.), The Mycota, Vol. 5, Plant Relationships, 2nd ed., 2009, Approx. 390 p. 96 illus., 24 in color., Hardcover, . https://www.springer.com/life+sci/microbiology/book/978-3-540-87406-5 (in press).

References

External links 
 Holger  B. Deising on the webpage of the University Halle-Wittenberg Germany
 Publications at the University Halle-Wittenberg

1956 births
German agronomists
Living people